John Thorne (born October 29, 1947) is a former American football coach. He served as the head football coach at North Central College in Naperville, Illinois from 2002 to 2014, compiling a record of 118–30.

Career
From 2002 to 2014 he served at head football coach at North Central, compiling a record of 118–30. In 2015, Thorne stepped down from his position as head coach and was replaced by his son, Jeff Thorne. Thorne also served as head coach at Wheaton Warrenville South High School (formerly known as Wheaton Central High School) from 1980 to 2001, winning four state championships.

Honors
In 2016, Thorne was inducted into the NCC Athletic Hall of Fame.

Head coaching record

College

References

External links
 North Central profile

1957 births
Living people
North Central Cardinals football coaches
High school football coaches in Illinois
Illinois Wesleyan University alumni
Northern Illinois University alumni